The Acts of Peter and Andrew is a short 3rd-century text from the New Testament apocrypha, not to be confused with either the Acts of Andrew or the Acts of Peter. The text is unusual in apparently containing no attempt at espousing doctrine, and is likely simply to have been a work of literature rather than theology.

The text consists of a series of extremely long tales of miracles, such as Andrew riding a cloud to where Peter is, and Peter literally putting a camel through the eye of a needle, turning the traditional metaphor ("it is easier for a camel to pass through the eye of the needle than for a rich man to enter the kingdom of heaven") on its head. The text appears to have been aimed to be a continuation of the Acts of Andrew and Matthias (which was a portion of the Acts of Andrew that was sometimes found as a separate work).

References

External links
 
 

Apocryphal Acts
Petrine-related books